Luxulyan railway station serves the civil parish and village of Luxulyan in mid-Cornwall, England. Great Western Railway manage the station and operates all the trains that call.

History
The first railway at Luxulyan was a horse-worked line from Par Harbour to Molinnis which was built by Joseph Treffry, opening on 18 May 1847.  It climbed up the side of the Luxulyan Valley on a cable-worked incline and then crossed it on the Treffry Viaduct.

On 1 June 1874 a new line was opened by the Cornwall Minerals Railway.  Running from Fowey to Newquay, it bypassed the incline, instead passing beneath the Treffry Viaduct and entering Luxulyan through the 50 yard (46m) Luxulyan Tunnel.  The tramway was retained from Luxulyan over the Treffry Viaduct to a quarry at Colcerrow until about 1933.

A new siding to serve the Treskilling China Clay Works was opened in 1916.  This survived until 1975 but the public goods yard closed on 27 September 1964, as did the connection to the stub of the Colcerrow branch east of the station.  The passing loop and the second platform face were taken out of use at the same time.

Facilities
There is a single platform on the east side of the track which has a shelter and seats. At the southern end of this is the car park which connects to a small lane that leads to the village's main road. The station has a solar powered help point which allows waiting people to find out when the next trains will arrive.

Services
Luxulyan is a request stop on the line, so passengers wishing to alight must inform the conductor and passengers wishing to join the train must signal to the driver. The typical service is one train every two hours in each direction between Par and Newquay, with some services extending to Plymouth and one train in the summer extending to Penzance. On summer Saturdays, there is just one train per day in each direction due to the intercity services running through to Newquay in lieu of the local services. Trains are usually operated by Class 150 Sprinters.

Community rail
The trains between Par and Newquay are designated as a community rail service and is supported by marketing provided by the Devon and Cornwall Rail Partnership.  The line is promoted under the Atlantic Coast Line name. The Kings Arms pub in Luxulyan is part of the Atlantic Coast Line rail ale trail.

References

External links
LuxSoft: Derailment of a High Speed Train in the Valley

Railway stations in Cornwall
Former Great Western Railway stations
Railway stations in Great Britain opened in 1876
Railway stations served by Great Western Railway
Railway request stops in Great Britain
DfT Category F2 stations